Mask is the debut studio album by Japanese rock band Fanatic Crisis. It was released by the independent label Noir on January 7, 1996. Two versions of the cover exist, a black one with a white sleeve, and a regular edition with a white cover.

Track listing

Personnel 
Tsutomu Ishizuki − vocals
Kazuya − lead guitar
Shun − rhythm guitar
Ryuji − bass
Tatsuya − drums

References

Fanatic Crisis albums
1996 albums